Nicolene Terblanche (born 22 February 1988) is a South African field hockey player. At the 2012 Summer Olympics she competed with the South Africa women's national field hockey team in the women's tournament.

References

External links

1988 births
Living people
People from Groblersdal
Afrikaner people
Field hockey players at the 2012 Summer Olympics
Olympic field hockey players of South Africa
South African female field hockey players
Field hockey players at the 2014 Commonwealth Games
Field hockey players at the 2018 Commonwealth Games
Female field hockey defenders
Sportspeople from Limpopo
Commonwealth Games competitors for South Africa